World Wide Live is a live album by German rock band Scorpions released in 1985. The original audio recording was produced by Dieter Dierks. A VHS was released at the same time with footage of Scorpions' world tour.

The live album was originally released as a 2LP vinyl set, in a gatefold-sleeve, and a cassette. The liner notes contain a crew member list, tour date information and when the shows were recorded:

Bercy, Paris, France (1984-02-29)
The Forum, Los Angeles, CA, USA (1984-04-24 & 1984-04-25)
Sports Arena, San Diego, CA, USA (1984-04-26)
Pacific Amphitheatre, Costa Mesa, CA, USA (1984-04-28)
Sporthalle, Cologne, West Germany (1984-11-17)

The initial CD release featured 15 tracks (dropping "Another Piece of Meat", "Six-String Sting" and "Can't Get Enough", parts 1 & 2, due to time constraints), but the remastered edition of 1997 features the original album in full.

Track listing

Audio
Side one
 "Countdown" (Klaus Meine, Matthias Jabs) - 0:41
 "Coming Home" (Rudolf Schenker, Meine) - 3:17 (original studio version appears on Love at First Sting, 1984)
 "Blackout" (Schenker, Meine, Herman Rarebell, Sonja Kittelsen) - 4:11 (original studio version appears on Blackout, 1982)
 "Bad Boys Running Wild" (Schenker, Meine, Rarebell) - 3:45 (original studio version appears on Love at First Sting)
 "Loving You Sunday Morning" (Schenker, Meine, Rarebell) - 4:41 (original studio version appears on Lovedrive, 1979)
 "Make It Real" (Schenker, Rarebell) - 3:51 (original studio version appears on Animal Magnetism, 1980)

Side two
"Big City Nights" (Schenker, Meine) – 4:49 (original studio version appears on Love at First Sting)
 "Coast to Coast" (Schenker) – 4:40 (original studio version appears on Lovedrive)
 "Holiday" (Schenker, Meine) – 3:12 (original studio version appears on Lovedrive)
 "Still Loving You" (Schenker, Meine) – 5:44 (original studio version appears on Love at First Sting)

Side three
 "Rock You Like a Hurricane" (Schenker, Meine, Rarebell) – 4:04 (original studio version appears on Love at First Sting)
 "Can't Live Without You" (Schenker, Meine) – 5:28 (original studio version appears on Blackout)
 "Another Piece of Meat" (Schenker, Rarebell) – 5:36 (original studio version appears on Lovedrive)
 "Dynamite" (Schenker, Meine, Rarebell) – 7:05 (original studio version appears on Blackout)

Side four
"The Zoo" (Schenker, Meine) – 5:46 (original studio version appears on Animal Magnetism)
 "No One Like You" (Schenker, Meine) – 4:07 (original studio version appears on Blackout)
 "Can't Get Enough", Pt. 1 (Schenker, Meine) – 1:59 (original studio version appears on Lovedrive)
 "Six String Sting" (Matthias Jabs guitar solo) – 5:18
 "Can't Get Enough", Pt. 2 (Schenker, Meine) – 1:52 (original studio version appears on Lovedrive)

Video
 "Coming Home"
 "Blackout"
 "Big City Nights"
 "Loving You Sunday Morning"
 "No One Like You"
 "Holiday"
 "Bad Boys Running Wild"
 "Still Loving You"
 "Rock You Like a Hurricane"
 "Dynamite"
 "I‘m Leaving You" (Studio version which plays over credits)

Personnel
Scorpions
Klaus Meine – lead vocals, rhythm guitar on "Coast to Coast"
Rudolf Schenker – rhythm guitars, lead guitars on "Big City Nights", "Coast To Coast", "Holiday" and "Still Loving You", backing vocals
Matthias Jabs – lead guitars, rhythm guitars  on "Big City Nights", "Coast To Coast", "Holiday" and "Still Loving You", talk box on “The Zoo”, backing vocals
Francis Buchholz – bass, backing vocals
Herman Rarebell – drums, backing vocals

Production
Dieter Dierks – producer, audio mixing
Mike Beiriger – engineer, mixing
David Hewitt – engineer
Gerd Rautenbach – engineer

Charts

Album

Singles

Certifications

References

Scorpions (band) live albums
Scorpions (band) video albums
1985 live albums
1985 video albums
Harvest Records live albums
Mercury Records live albums
Albums produced by Dieter Dierks